Stephan Stückler (born October 31, 1985 in Grafenstein) is an Austrian footballer who currently plays as a striker for SC Ritzing.

External links
 

1985 births
Living people
Austrian footballers
LASK players
SV Bad Aussee players
SK Austria Kärnten players
Wolfsberger AC players
TSV Hartberg players
Austrian Football Bundesliga players
Association football forwards